Tissemsilt is a municipality in Algeria. It is the capital of Tissemsilt Province and Tissemsilt District.

External links

 

Communes of Tissemsilt Province
Province seats of Algeria
Tissemsilt Province